Edith Cutaran Lopez-Tiempo (April 22, 1919 – August 21, 2011),was a Filipino poet, fiction writer, teacher and literary critic in the English language. She was conferred the National Artist Award for Literature in 1999.

Biography
Tiempo was born in Bayombong, Nueva Vizcaya. Her poems are intricate verbal transfigurations of significant experiences as revealed, in two of her much anthologized pieces, "Halaman" and "Bonsai." As fictionist, Tiempo is as morally profound. Her language has been marked as "descriptive but unburdened by scrupulous detailing." She is an influential tradition in Philippine Literature in English. Together with her late husband, writer and critic Edilberto K. Tiempo, they founded (in 1962) and directed the Silliman National Writers Workshop in Dumaguete City, which has produced some of the Philippines' best writers.

Works

Novels
A Blade of Fern (1978)
His Native Coast (1979)
The Alien Corn (1992)
One, Tilting Leaves (1995)
The Builder (2004) 
The Jumong (2006)

Short story collections
Abide, Joshua, and Other Stories (1964)

Poetry collections
 The Tracks of Babylon and Other Poems (1966)
 The Charmer's Box and Other Poet (1993)
 Marginal Annotations and Other Poems
 Commend Contend. Beyond Extensions (2010)

Honors and awards
 National Artist Award for Literature (1999)
 Carlos Palanca Memorial Awards for Literature
 Cultural Center of the Philippines (1979, First Prize in Novel)
 Gawad Pambansang Alagad ni Balagtas (1988)

References

National Artists of the Philippines
Filipino women novelists
Filipino novelists
Silliman University people
1919 births
2011 deaths
People from Nueva Vizcaya
20th-century novelists
20th-century women writers